The 1970 Marshall Thundering Herd football team was an American football team that represented Marshall University as an independent during the 1970 NCAA University Division football season. In its second season under head coach Rick Tolley, the team compiled a 3–6 record and was outscored by a total of 202 to 138. The team played its home games at Fairfield Stadium in Huntington, West Virginia.

On November 14, Southern Airways Flight 932, which was chartered by the school to fly the Thundering Herd football team, coaches, and fans to Kinston, North Carolina for a game against the East Carolina Pirates and back to Huntington, crashed on approach to Tri-State Airport after clipping trees just west of the runway and impacting nose-first into a hollow.  All 75 people on board died. 37 of them were members of the football team. It was the worst single air tragedy in NCAA sports history. The tragedy was depicted in the movie We Are Marshall (2006) and the documentary film Marshall University: Ashes to Glory (2000).

Schedule

Roster

Coaching staff
 Rick Tolley – Head Coach
 Jim Moss – Offensive Coordinator
 Red Dawson – Defensive Coordinator
 Deke Brackett – Kicking Game
 Al Carelli, Jr. – Offensive line
 Mickey Jackson – Backfield
 Carl Kokor – Defensive Line
 Frank Loria – Defensive Backs

See also
 Southern Airways Flight 932

References

Marshall
Marshall Thundering Herd football seasons
Victims of aviation accidents or incidents in the United States
Accidental deaths in West Virginia
Marshall Thundering Herd football